Bill Perry may refer to:

Bill Perry (rugby union) (1886–1970), Wales rugby union international
Bill Perry (cartoonist) (1905–1995), cartoonist
Bill Perry (footballer) (1930–2007), English footballer
Bill Perry (musician) (1957–2007), American blues singer/songwriter and guitarist
William J. Perry, US Secretary of Defence in the Clinton administration

See also
William Perry (disambiguation)
William Parry (disambiguation) for "Bill Parry"